The following is the cumulative medal count for countries at the Four Continents Figure Skating Championships.

Men

Women

Pairs

Ice dance

Overall

See also
 All-time European Figure Skating Championships medal table

External links
 Isuresults.com

Four Continents Figure Skating Championships
Four Continents
Lists of figure skating medalists